Gabor Breznay (born 1956, in Budapest, Hungary) is a painter living in Paris, France.

Life and career
He is the son of József Breznay, Hungarian painter. Breznay is a graduate of the Paris Beaux-Arts School. He has many exhibitions in France and Europe. His work appears in the private collections in France, Germany, Italy, USA and Hungary. He also has work in the public collection of the Town of Pontoise in France. 
Represented by the Galerie Stackl'r.http://www.galeriestacklr.com

Various artwork

Personal exhibitions

Group shows

External links
Official website
ArtActif.com 

20th-century French painters
20th-century French male artists
French male painters
21st-century French painters
21st-century French male artists
Artists from Budapest
Living people
1956 births